Tudor Court, Penley is a house  south of the village of Penley, Wrexham, Wales.  It was originally called Llannerch Panna.

History

The house was built in 1878–79 for Hon. George T. Kenyon, the younger son of the 3rd Baron Kenyon.  It was designed by the Chester architect John Douglas.  A kitchen wing was added in the 20th century.

Architecture

It is entirely half-timbered on a plinth of Ruabon red brick.  The bricks for the chimneys and the roof tiles are also from Ruabon.  The house is in two storeys and consists of a hall with cross wings, and a two-storeyed porch in the angle of one of the wings.  Internally there is a gallery encircling the hall.

See also

List of houses and associated buildings by John Douglas

References

Further reading

Houses in Wrexham
Houses completed in 1879
John Douglas buildings